Molecular Plant Pathology is a monthly open access peer-reviewed scientific journal published by Wiley-Blackwell on behalf of the British Society for Plant Pathology. It was established in January 2000 by Gary D. Foster, University of Bristol, who acted as editor-in-chief from 2000 to 2012. The journal covers research concerning plant pathology, in particular its molecular aspects such as plant-pathogen interactions. The current editor-in-chief is Ralph A. Dean (North Carolina State University). The journal had a 2017 impact factor of 4.188, ranking it 17th out of 223 journals in the category "Plant Sciences". The journal became open access in January 2019.

Chief editors
Gary D. Foster (2000–2012)
Martin B. Dickman (2012–2017)
Ralph A. Dean (since 2017)

References

External links

Phytopathology
Wiley-Blackwell academic journals
Botany journals
English-language journals
Publications established in 2000
9 times per year journals